Islam Bayramukov (born June 12, 1971) is a Kazakh wrestler who competed in the Men's Freestyle 97 kg at the 2000 Summer Olympics and won the silver medal. He was born in Jambyl Region. He also competed in the 1996 and 2004 Summer Olympics, but did not reach the final rounds.

References

1971 births
Living people
People from Jambyl Region
Wrestlers at the 1996 Summer Olympics
Wrestlers at the 2000 Summer Olympics
Kazakhstani male sport wrestlers
Wrestlers at the 2004 Summer Olympics
Olympic silver medalists for Kazakhstan
Olympic wrestlers of Kazakhstan
Olympic medalists in wrestling
Asian Games medalists in wrestling
Wrestlers at the 1994 Asian Games
Wrestlers at the 1998 Asian Games
Wrestlers at the 2002 Asian Games
Medalists at the 2000 Summer Olympics
Medalists at the 1994 Asian Games
Asian Games bronze medalists for Kazakhstan
21st-century Kazakhstani people
20th-century Kazakhstani people